Édouard Van Haelen (22 July 1895 – 16 June 1936) was a Belgian breaststroke swimmer. He competed in two events at the 1920 Summer Olympics.

References

External links
 

1895 births
1936 deaths
Belgian male breaststroke swimmers
Olympic swimmers of Belgium
Swimmers at the 1920 Summer Olympics
Place of birth missing